Jackie Mitchell (1913–1987) was an American female baseball player.

Jackie Mitchell may also refer to:

Jackie Mitchell (gridiron football) (born 1976), American and Canadian football player
Jackie Mitchell (swimmer), participated in Swimming at the 1980 Summer Paralympics
Jacqui Mitchell (born 1936), American bridge player

See also

Jack Mitchell (disambiguation)
Jackie Mittell (1906–1976), Welsh professional footballer
John Mitchell (disambiguation)